Surendrapal Singh (born 25 September 1953) is an Indian film and television character actor who works in Hindi films and TV series. He is best known for his roles of Dronacharya in Mahabharat, Amatya Rakshas in Chanakya, Tamraj Kilvish in Shaktiman and Daksha in Devon Ke Dev - Mahadev.

Starting in 1984, Pal has worked in numerous films (Khuda Gawah, Sehar and Jodhaa Akbar) and television serials such as Woh Rehne Waali Mehlon Ki, Left Right Left and Vishnu Puran, where he played the role of Guru Shukracharya, teacher of the demons.

One of his most notable roles on TV was that of Vikranta Jabbar. He played Vikranta Jabbar in Ramsay Brothers produced horror TV serial Zee Horror Shows episode Saya.

In 2007, Pal started a production company to produce and direct Bhojpuri films. He produced a Bhojpuri film Bhauji Ke Sister.

Filmography

Films

Krodhi (1981) as Victor
Khuda Kasam (1981) as Chouhan
Grahasthi (1984)
Manzil Manzil (1984)
Paapi Sansar (1985)
Maa Kasam (1985)
Ghulami (1985)
Ek Naya Rishta (1988) as Vikram
Aakhri Nishchay (1988)
Tamas (1988)
Tejaa (1990)
Shaitani Ilaaka (1990)
Aakhri Cheekh (1991)
 Kurbaan (1991)
Vishkanya
Khuda Gawah (1992)
Platform (1993)
Policewala Gunda (1995)
Veergati (1995)
Paandav (1995)
Prayikkara Pappan (1995) as Palani/Thekkan - Malayalam film
Return of Jewel Thief (1996)
Mr. Romeo (1996) - Tamil film
Rajali (1996) - Tamil film
Judge Mujrim (1997)
Hafta Vasuli
Maharaani (2001)
Indian (2001) as Police Comminsoner
Dhund: The Fog (2003)
Bardaasht (2004)
Lakshya (2004)
Ab Tumhare Hawale Watan Saathiyo (2004)
Sehar (2005) - Ramnath Mishra
Jo Bole So Nihaal (2005) - Balwant Singh
Aseema: Beyond Boundaries (2007)
Jodhaa Akbar (2008) - Rana Uday Singh
Asal (2010) - Tamil film
Rann Neeti-The Conspiracy Plan (2010) (shooting with Dir. K. Shyam Agerwal)
Binu Sheela Sunila (2010) - Malayalam - Meghavat
Aisan Pyar Se Dekhbu T Pyar Ho Jai - Bhojpuri (2010) (shooting with Dir. K. Shyam Agerwal)
Mahabharat Aur Barbareek - Hindi (2013) - Drona (directed by Dharmesh Tiwari)
Gurjar Aandolan (2014) - Nageena Singh - (Villain) (directed by Aarun Nagar)
Airlift (2016) - External Affairs Minister
1920 London - Shivangi's father
 Maa Tujhe Salaam (Bhojpuri film) - 2018

Television
Bharat Ek Khoj (1988)- episodes 32 and 33 Akbar role of Man Singh, episodes 35 and 36 Aurangzeb role of Dara Shikoh
Mahabharat (1988) - Dronacharya
Chanakya (1991) - Mahamatya Rakshas (Mahamatya Katyayan)
Kanoon (1993) - Judge
Zee Horror Show (1995) - Dhundh
Shaktimaan (1997) - Tamraj Kilvish
Amanat (1997)
C.I.D. (2005) - D.C.P. (episodes 366, 367, 369, 378, 380, 388 and 390)
Vishnu Puran  (2000) - Shukracharaya
Ramayan (2002) - Ravana
Aakhir Kaun
Shagun (2001–2004) Kailashnath
Vishnupuran (2003) - Guru Shukracharya
Urmila (2003)
Kunti (2003)
Dharti Ka Veer Yodha Prithviraj Chauhan (2006)
Kumkum - Chandumal Mishra
Left Right Left (2006) - Virendra Rai Chauhan
Woh Rehne Waali Mehlon Ki - Guruji
Maryada (2007) - Rajvir Singh
Chotti Bahu (TV series) - Mr. Purohit
Neeli Aankhen (2008)
Sujata (2008) - M.D. Shah
Waqt Batayega Kaun Apna Kaun Paraya - Sarvadaman Raichawdhury
Santaan
Babul Ka Aangann Chootey Na
Love u Zindagi
Ma Shakti - Rakthabija, and Rambha (Mahishasur's father)
Devon Ke Dev...Mahadev (2011) - Daksha
Diya Aur Baati Hum (Star Plus)
Desh Ki Beti Nandini - Inderraj Raghuvanshi
Maharana Pratap - Rao Maldeo Rathore
Pradhanmantri (2013–14) B. R. Ambedkar
Siya Ke Ram (2016) Vishrava, father of Ravan
Jaana Na Dil Se Door (2016–2017) Ravish's grandfather
Suryaputra Karn (2015) Parashurama
  Adhikaar ek kasam ek tapasya (2015)
Chandrakanta (2017) - King Avantimala
Prithvi Vallabh − Itihaas Bhi, Rahasya Bhi - Guru Vinayaditya
Ghar Sansaar as Rakeshnath Inamdar
Na Umra Ki Seema Ho as Pratap

References

External links
 

Indian male film actors
Indian male television actors
Indian male voice actors
Male actors in Hindi cinema
Living people
People from Lucknow
1953 births
People from Ghazipur